Tabeau may refer to:

Jerzy Tabeau, an Auschwitz survivor
Pierre-Antoine Tabeau, a Catholic priest